Rebecca Mary Evans (born 2 August 1976) is a Welsh Labour and Co-operative politician, serving as Minister for Finance since 2018 and Minister for Local Government since 2021.  She has served as the Member of the Senedd (MS) for Gower since 2016, and a Member for Mid and West Wales from 2011 to 2016.

Evans has previously served in the Welsh Government as the Deputy Minister for Farming and Food (2014–16), Minister for Social Care and Public Health (2016–17) and Minister for Housing and Regeneration (2017–18). She was Trefnydd (Leader) of the Senedd from 2018 to 2021.

Early life and career
Evans obtained a BA degree in history at the University of Leeds, and an MPhil in Historical Studies at Sidney Sussex College, Cambridge.

She worked as Policy and Public Affairs Officer for a national charity representing disabled people and their families. Evans is also a former Welsh Labour Organiser for Mid and West Wales, and a former Senior Researcher and Communications Officer for an Assembly Member.

Member of the Senedd
Evans was elected in 2011 as one of four regional MSs representing Mid and West Wales in the Senedd. At the 2016 election, she was elected as the member for the Gower Constituency.

Between her election in 2011 and her promotion to ministerial office, Evans served on the National Assembly for Wales’ Environment and Sustainable Development Committee and its Common Agricultural Policy Task and Finish Group, the Heath and Social Care Committee, and the Children, Young People and Education Committee. She has also served as chair of the Cross-party group on Nursing and midwifery, the cross-party group on mental health and was the co-chair of the cross-party group on disability.

Ministerial career

On 8 July 2014, Evans joined the Welsh Government as the Deputy Minister for Agriculture and Fisheries, in a minor reshuffle following the sacking of Alun Davies. The office was renamed to Deputy Minister for Farming and Food in September 2014. 

Following the 2016 Senedd election, she was appointed to the new role of Minister for Social Care and Public Health. She moved to another new role as Minister for Housing and Regeneration in a reshuffle on 3 November 2017.

In December 2018, Evans joined Mark Drakeford's first Cabinet as the Minister for Finance and Trefnydd (Leader) of the Senedd.

Evans introduced and was the government minister responsible for the Welsh Tax Acts etc. (Power to Modify) Act 2022 which allowed the Welsh government to amend tax law using statutory instruments.

References

External links
 
 Official website
Rebecca Evans MS on the Welsh Government website.

1976 births
Living people
People from Bridgend
Alumni of the University of Leeds
Alumni of Sidney Sussex College, Cambridge
Welsh Labour members of the Senedd
Wales AMs 2011–2016
Wales MSs 2016–2021
Wales MSs 2021–2026
Ministers for Finance of Wales
Female finance ministers